The Executive of the 6th Northern Ireland Assembly was appointed on 11 January 2020, after the confirmation of Arlene Foster and Michelle O'Neill as First and deputy First Ministers.

Following the 2 March 2017 elections to the sixth Northern Ireland Assembly, the Democratic Unionist Party (DUP) and Sinn Féin remained the two largest parties in the Assembly. Parties in Northern Ireland that were eligible to join the Northern Ireland Executive were given a deadline of 27 March 2017 to form an Executive. The deadline passed and Secretary of State for Northern Ireland James Brokenshire passed an emergency law at Westminster to allow more time for talks to take place. Brokenshire threatened direct rule if no agreement was reached by early May 2017. This deadline was later extended to 29 June after Prime Minister, Theresa May's decision to call a snap general election for 8 June 2017.

On 29 June 2017, the DUP and Sinn Féin had both announced that they had not come to an agreement to form the next Northern Ireland Executive. Brokenshire extended the deadline until 3 July 2017 for further talks to continue.  Abortive talks continued intermittently through 2017, 2018 and 2019 but were overshadowed by the UK Brexit Withdrawal Agreement and the DUP role in supporting the minority British Government.  Intensive talks resumed in December 2019 following the 2019 UK General Election with a new deadline of 13 January 2020 for fresh assembly elections set by Secretary of State Julian Smith.  An agreement was published by the two governments on 9 January 2020 and it was accepted by the leading parties.

The Ulster Unionist Party (UUP), Social Democratic and Labour Party (SDLP) and Alliance Party of Northern Ireland returned to the Executive, having been absent since 2016; Alliance's Naomi Long obtained the cross-community vote to become Minister for Justice.

5th Executive of Northern Ireland

See also 
List of Northern Ireland Executives
Members of the Northern Ireland Assembly elected in 2017

References

Northern Ireland Executive
Northern Ireland, Executive of the Northern Ireland Assembly 5th
Ministries of the Northern Ireland Assembly
2020 establishments in Northern Ireland
Cabinets established in 2020
2020s disestablishments in Northern Ireland
Cabinets disestablished in 2022
Ministries of Elizabeth II